The Wadbilliga River is a perennial stream of the Tuross River catchment that is located in the South Coast region of New South Wales, Australia.

Course and features
The Wadbilliga River rises on the western slopes of Mount Wadbilliga, located within Wadbilliga National Park and part of the Kybeyan Range, within the Great Dividing Range. The river flows generally north, east northeast, east by south, and then northeast, before reaching its confluence with the Tuross River, east of the locale of Belowa. The river descends  over its  course.

See also

 List of rivers of Australia
 List of rivers of New South Wales (L–Z)
 Rivers of New South Wales

References

External links
 

Rivers of New South Wales
South Coast (New South Wales)